Derrick Scott Mein is an American sport shooter. He represented USA at the 2020 Summer Olympics in Tokyo.

References

External links

1985 births
Living people
American male sport shooters
Shooters at the 2020 Summer Olympics
Olympic shooters of the United States
People from Girard, Kansas
People from Paola, Kansas